Galuyak or Galooyek or Galuyok or Geluyok may refer to:
 Galuyak-e Olya
 Galuyak-e Sofla